The 1882 Boston Red Caps season was the twelfth season of the franchise. The Red Caps were a team in transition, as co-founder and longtime manager Harry Wright left the team and was replaced by John Morrill.

Regular season

Season standings

Record vs. opponents

Roster

Player stats

Batting

Starters by position
Note: Pos = Position; G = Games played; AB = At bats; H = Hits; Avg. = Batting average; HR = Home runs; RBI = Runs batted in

Other batters
Note: G = Games played; AB = At bats; H = Hits; Avg. = Batting average; HR = Home runs; RBI = Runs batted in

Pitching

Starting pitchers
Note: G = Games pitched; IP = Innings pitched; W = Wins; L = Losses; ERA = Earned run average; SO = Strikeouts

Relief pitchers
Note: G = Games pitched; W = Wins; L = Losses; SV = Saves; ERA = Earned run average; SO = Strikeouts

References
1882 Boston Red Caps season at Baseball Reference

Boston Red Caps seasons
Boston Red Caps
Boston Red Caps
19th century in Boston